Stasys Sabaliauskas (22 April 1905 – 16 April 1927) was a Lithuanian footballer who competed in the 1924 Summer Olympics.

Sabaliauskas made his footballing international debut at the 1924 Summer Olympics in France, but his team were beaten by the more experienced Switzerland side 0-9 and so didn't advance any further in the tournament, he went on to play five more times in which he scored three goals.

In December 1926, Sabaliauskas played in the first Lithuania men's national basketball team.

References

External links
 

1905 births
1927 deaths
Lithuanian footballers
Lithuania international footballers
Footballers at the 1924 Summer Olympics
Olympic footballers of Lithuania
Association football forwards
Lithuanian men's basketball players